The fourth series of Made in Chelsea, a British structured-reality television programme, began airing on 15 October 2012 on E4. The series concluded on 17 December 2012 after 10 episodes, however a 60-minute Christmas special episode aired immediately after the series on 24 December 2012, which was then followed by an end of season special presented by Rick Edwards on 31 December 2012 featuring a reunion of the cast to discuss events from the series. The series saw the arrival of several new cast members including Andy Jordan, Ashley James, Carly Rothman, Sam Cussins, Sophia Sassoon, Stevie Johnson and Lucy Watson, as well as the departure of original cast members Fredrik Ferrier and Gabriella Ellis. This series also featured the long triangle between Sophia, Francis and Proudlock, the rivalry between Millie and Victoria increasing, the brief reconnection between Gabriella and Ollie, and the rocky relationship between Spencer and Louise until the revelation that he cheated on her.

Cast

Episodes

{| class="wikitable plainrowheaders" style="width:100%; background:#fff;"
|- style="color:white"
! style="background:#3ADF00;"| SeriesNo.
! style="background:#3ADF00;"| EpisodeNo.
! style="background:#3ADF00;"| Title
! style="background:#3ADF00;"| Original airdate
! style="background:#3ADF00;"| Duration
! style="background:#3ADF00;"| UK viewers

|}

Ratings

External links

References

2012 British television seasons
Made in Chelsea seasons